Tessa Ann Vosper Blackstone, Baroness Blackstone,  (born 27 September 1942) is an English politician and university administrator.

Early life
Her father, Geoffrey Vaughan Blackstone, CBE, GM, was the Chief Fire Officer for Hertfordshire and her mother, Joanna Vosper, was an actress and model for the House of Worth in Paris. She was educated at Ware Grammar School for Girls and the London School of Economics, where she gained a doctorate. Her doctoral thesis titled "The provision of pre-school education: A study of the influences on the development of nursery education in Britain from 1900–1965", and was submitted in 1969.

Career

Her academic career began at the former Enfield College (now Middlesex University) before she went on to become a lecturer at the LSE and Professor of Educational Administration at the University of London Institute of Education.

Blackstone was Deputy Education Officer of the Inner London Education Authority (1983–1986). She has also worked as a policy adviser in the Cabinet Office. As a member of Jim Callaghan's Downing Street thinktank, she upset the Foreign Office by criticizing diplomats' lavish lifestyles.

She headed Birkbeck College, University of London, for a decade as Master (from 1987 to 1997) until her appointment to the new Labour government in 1997. She has also held research fellowships at the Centre for Studies in Public Policy and the Policy Studies Institute. In 2004, Blackstone became Vice-Chancellor of the University of Greenwich, holding this position up to 2011.

She has served as chairman of the ballet board of the Royal Opera House, the Fabian Society, and the Institute for Public Policy Research (IPPR), and has sat on the governing bodies of numerous other organisations. She has been on the Board of Trustees of The Architecture Foundation. She is currently Chairman of the British Library and Chairman of Great Ormond Street hospital. She is currently the patron of Hamlin Fistula UK, a charity whose aim is to raise funds and awareness to support the Addis Ababa Fistula Hospital.

Politics
She is a Labour life peer and sits in the House of Lords, having been created Baroness Blackstone, of Stoke Newington in Greater London, on 18 March 1987. Originally on the Opposition front bench in House of Lords, Blackstone held a succession of portfolios during her time at Birkbeck.

Self-described as 'vintage' rather than old or new Labour, Blackstone was Minister for Education at the Department of Education from 1997 to 2001 then Minister for the Arts at the Department of Culture, Media and Sport 2001–2003. While in her position here she attended The European Higher Education Area Ministerial Conferences and was a member of the European Ministers of Education that signed The Bologna Declaration of 19 June 1999.

On 15 September 2010, Blackstone, along with 54 other public figures, signed an open letter published in The Guardian, stating their opposition to Pope Benedict XVI's state visit to the UK.

Current activities
She is a Patron of Humanists UK and chairs the Royal Institute of British Architects (RIBA) trust. She is an honorary associate of the National Secular Society. In 2009, she became the chair at Great Ormond Street Hospital, and later in 2010, she became chair at British Library, a 4-year term. In September 2012, she joined the board of the Orbit Group housing association as its future chair.

In January 2013, she became co-chair at the Franco-British Council together with Christian de Boissieu, an organisation which looks to promote better understanding between Britain and France and to contribute to the development of joint action. She is the chair to the British Section of the council. She became the Chair of the Bar Standards Board in January 2018.

Publications
Her publications, which mainly cover education and social policy issues, include:
 Disadvantage and Education with Jo Mortimore (Heinemann, 1982)
 Race Relations in Britain with Bhikhu Parekh and Peter Saunders (Routledge, 1997)

References

External links

Vice-Chancellor – Baroness Blackstone at University of Greenwich
Donald MacLeod, The Guardian, 12 July 2005, "Tessa Blackstone: Naval gazing"

Alumni of the London School of Economics
Alumni of Middlesex University
British humanists
Life peeresses created by Elizabeth II
Blackstone, Tessa Blackstone, Baroness
Members of the Privy Council of the United Kingdom
Academics of the UCL Institute of Education
Masters of Birkbeck, University of London
People associated with the University of Greenwich
1942 births
Living people
Honorary Fellows of the London School of Economics
Chairs of the Fabian Society
Place of birth missing (living people)